Sheridan County (standard abbreviation: SD) is a county located in the U.S. state of Kansas. As of the 2020 census, the county population was 2,447. Its county seat is Hoxie.  The county was named in honor of Phillip H. Sheridan, a general of the American Civil War era.

History

Early history

For many millennia, the Great Plains of North America was inhabited by nomadic Native Americans.  From the 16th century to 18th century, the Kingdom of France claimed ownership of large parts of North America.  In 1762, after the French and Indian War, France secretly ceded New France to Spain, per the Treaty of Fontainebleau.

19th century
In 1802, Spain returned most of the land to France while keeping title to about 7,500 square miles.  In 1803, most of the land for modern day Kansas was acquired by the United States from France as part of the 828,000 square miles Louisiana Purchase for 2.83 cents per acre.

In 1854, the Kansas Territory was organized, then in 1861 Kansas became the 34th U.S. state.  In 1873, the remaining unorganized western part of the state was divided into 22 new counties, including Sheridan County.  Sheridan County was then organized in 1880, with the county seat at Kenneth.  After it became apparent in 1886, that the railroad line coming to the area would run south of Kenneth to the new town of Hoxie, the residents of Kenneth accepted an offer to get new lots in Hoxie (and move their buildings at no expense), and the county seat transferred to Hoxie.  The Lincoln-Colorado railroad line opened through the county in 1888, and formally became part of the Union Pacific Railroad in the late 1890s.

20th century

The population of Sheridan County grew in the early 20th century and peaked in 1930 at 6,038 residents.  Since then the population has steadily declined, as part of the general depopulation of the Great Plains.

The rail line stayed in operation in Sheridan County until 1998.  After flooding east of Plainville in the 1993 floods damaged the line, the railroad concluded it would not be cost effective to rebuild, and the entire line from Plainville to Colby was abandoned by 1998.

Geography

Adjacent counties
 Decatur County (north)
 Norton County (northeast)
 Graham County (east)
 Gove County (south)
 Thomas County (west)

Demographics

As of the census of 2000, there were 2,813 people, 1,124 households, and 795 families residing in the county.  The population density was 3 people per square mile (1/km2).  There were 1,263 housing units at an average density of 1 per square mile (1/km2).  The racial makeup of the county was 98.65% White, 0.14% Black or African American, 0.07% Native American, 0.07% Asian, 0.14% Pacific Islander, 0.36% from other races, and 0.57% from two or more races.  1.46% of the population were Hispanic or Latino of any race.

There were 1,124 households, out of which 30.40% had children under the age of 18 living with them, 63.80% were married couples living together, 4.50% had a female householder with no husband present, and 29.20% were non-families. 27.60% of all households were made up of individuals, and 14.80% had someone living alone who was 65 years of age or older.  The average household size was 2.46 and the average family size was 3.01.

In the county, the population was spread out, with 26.30% under the age of 18, 5.80% from 18 to 24, 23.70% from 25 to 44, 23.90% from 45 to 64, and 20.30% who were 65 years of age or older.  The median age was 42 years. For every 100 females there were 100.10 males.  For every 100 females age 18 and over, there were 95.80 males.

The median income for a household in the county was $33,547, and the median income for a family was $38,292. Males had a median income of $26,351 versus $16,250 for females. The per capita income for the county was $16,299.  About 12.00% of families and 15.70% of the population were below the poverty line, including 27.30% of those under age 18 and 5.50% of those age 65 or over.

Government

Presidential elections

Sheridan County is overwhelmingly Republican. Since Michael Dukakis in the heavily drought-influenced 1988 election won almost 39 percent of the county's vote, no Democratic presidential candidate has topped 22 percent, and in 2016 Hillary Clinton’s share plummeted into single figures.

Laws
Although the Kansas Constitution was amended in 1986 to allow the sale of alcoholic liquor by the individual drink with the approval of voters, Sheridan County has remained a prohibition, or "dry", county.

Education

Unified school districts
 Hoxie USD 412

Communities

Cities
 Hoxie
 Selden

Unincorporated communities
 Angelus
 Seguin
 Studley
 Tasco

Townships
Sheridan County is divided into fourteen townships.  None of the cities within the county are considered governmentally independent, and all figures for the townships include those of the cities.  In the following table, the population center is the largest city (or cities) included in that township's population total, if it is of a significant size.

See also
 Dry counties

References

Further reading

 Standard Atlas of Sheridan County, Kansas; Geo. A. Ogle & Co; 58 pages; 1906.

External links

County
 
 Sheridan County - Directory of Public Officials
Other
 Discover Sheridan County
Maps
 Sheridan County Maps: Current, Historic, KDOT
 Kansas Highway Maps: Current, Historic, KDOT
 Kansas Railroad Maps: Current, 1996, 1915, KDOT and Kansas Historical Society

 
Kansas counties
1873 establishments in Kansas
Populated places established in 1873